Svetlana Stepankovskaya (born  1985) is a Russian model and is the 1st Runner-up of Miss Russia 2009.

Miss Russia 2009

Stepankovskaya won the title off Miss Krasnodar in 2008 and represented Krasnodarskiy Kray at the Miss Russia 2009 pageant in Moscow on March 7,  where she placed as 1st runner-up to the eventual winner, Sofia Rudieva.

In January 2011, she joined the girl band Mobilnye Blondinki.

References

External links
Miss Russia Official Website
Svetlana Stepankovskaya 

Living people
Russian beauty pageant winners
Russian female models
1985 births
People from Krasnodar